Alternative Chartbusters is the second studio album by UK band The Boys, released in 1978.

Track listing
All tracks composed by Casino Steel and Matt Dangerfield; except where indicated
Side A
"Brickfield Nights"  Lead vocal Matt Dangerfield 
"U.S.I." (Plain) Lead vocal Kid Reid 
"Taking On The World" (Reid)  Lead vocal Kid Reid 
"Sway (Quién Será)" (Ruiz)  Lead vocal Matt Dangerfield 
"Do The Contract"  Lead vocal Matt Dangerfield 
"Heroine"  Lead vocal Matt Dangerfield 
"Not Ready"  Lead vocal Kid Reid  
Side B
"Classified Susie"  Lead vocal Matt Dangerfield 
"T.C.P." (Plain) Lead vocal All 
"Neighbourhood Brats"  Lead vocal Matt Dangerfield 
"Stop Stop Stop" (Allan Clarke, Tony Hicks, Graham Nash)  Lead vocal Matt Dangerfield 
"Backstage Pass" (Plain)  Lead vocal Kid Reid 
"Talking"  Lead vocal Matt Dangerfield 
"Cast of Thousands"  Lead vocal Kid Reid

Personnel
Matt Dangerfield - guitar, vocals
Kid Reid - bass, vocals
Honest John Plain - guitar, vocals
Casino Steel - piano, vocals
Jack Black - drums

References

1978 albums
The Boys (UK band) albums
Fire Records (UK) albums